Halit Kılıç (born 1 March 1992 in Mardin) is a Turkish athlete competing in the 400 and 800 metres. He represented his country in the latter distance at the 2012 World Indoor Championships without advancing from the first round.

International competitions

Personal bests

Outdoor
400 metres – 46.41 (Ankara 2011)
800 metres – 1:47.90 (Tallinn 2011)
Indoor
400 metres – 47.51 (Istanbul 2013)
800 metres – 1:49.80 (Vienna 2011)

References

1992 births
Living people
Turkish male sprinters
Turkish male middle-distance runners
Mediterranean Games silver medalists for Turkey
Mediterranean Games medalists in athletics
Athletes (track and field) at the 2013 Mediterranean Games
Islamic Solidarity Games competitors for Turkey
Universiade medalists in athletics (track and field)
Universiade bronze medalists for Turkey
Medalists at the 2013 Summer Universiade
People from Mardin
Aksaray University alumni
21st-century Turkish people